= Kerim Sebatî =

Turkish politician

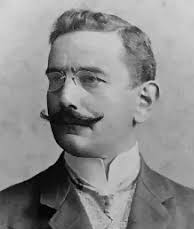

Personal details
- Born: 1870 Trabzon, Ottoman Empire
- Died: 1942 (aged 71–72)

Kerim Sebatî (1870–1942) was an Ottoman physician and politician, who was one of the original founders and a member of the Committee of the Ottoman Union, but he soon left when it got transformed into a political organisation by the nationalists.
